Úrsula Hilaria Celia de la Caridad Cruz Alfonso (21 October 1925 – 16 July 2003), known as Celia Cruz, was a naturalized Cuban-American singer and one of the most popular Latin artists of the 20th century. Cruz rose to fame in Cuba during the 1950s as a singer of guarachas, earning the nickname "La Guarachera de Cuba". In the following decades, she became known internationally as the "Queen of Salsa" due to her contributions to Latin music.

She began her career in her native Cuba, earning recognition as a vocalist of the popular musical group Sonora Matancera, a musical association that lasted fifteen years (1950-1965). Cruz mastered a wide variety of Afro-Cuban music styles including guaracha, rumba, afro, son and bolero, recording numerous singles in these styles for Seeco Records. In 1960, after the Cuban Revolution caused the nationalization of the music industry, Cruz left her native country, becoming one of the symbols and spokespersons of the Cuban community in exile. Cruz continued her career, first in Mexico, and then in the United States, the country that she took as her definitive residence. In the 1960s, she collaborated with Tito Puente, recording her signature tune "Bemba colorá". In the 1970s, she signed for Fania Records and became strongly associated with the salsa genre, releasing hits such as "Quimbara". She often appeared live with Fania All-Stars and collaborated with Johnny Pacheco and Willie Colón. During the last years of her career, Cruz continued to release successful songs such as "La vida es un carnaval" and "La negra tiene tumbao".

Her musical legacy is made up of a total of 37 studio albums, as well as numerous live albums and collaborations. Throughout her career, she was awarded numerous prizes and distinctions, including two Grammy Awards and three Latin Grammy Awards. In addition to her prolific career in music, Cruz also made several appearances as an actress in movies and telenovelas. Her catchphrase "¡Azúcar!" ("Sugar!") has become one of the most recognizable symbols of salsa music.

Early life 
Úrsula Hilaria Celia de la Caridad Cruz Alfonso was born on 21 October 1925, at 47 Serrano Street in the Santos Suárez neighborhood of Havana, Cuba. Her father, Simón Cruz, was a railway stoker, and her mother, Catalina Alfonso Ramos, a housewife who took care of an extended family. Celia was one of the eldest among fourteen children living in the house, including cousins and her three siblings, Dolores, Gladys, and Bárbaro, and she used to sing cradle songs to put them to sleep. According to her mother, she began singing as a child at 9 or 10 months of age, often in the middle of the night. She also sang in school during the Fridays' actos cívicos and in her neighborhood ensemble, Botón de oro.

While growing up in Cuba's diverse 1930s musical climate, Cruz listened to many musicians who influenced her adult career, including Fernando Collazo, Abelardo Barroso, Pablo Quevedo, Antonio Arcaño and Arsenio Rodríguez. Despite her father's opposition and the fact that she was Catholic, as a child Cruz learned Santería songs from her neighbor who practiced Santería. Cruz also studied the words to Yoruba songs with colleague Merceditas Valdés (an akpwon, a santería singer) from Cuba and later made various recordings of this religious genre, even singing backup for other akpwons like Candita Batista.

As a teenager, her aunt took her and her cousin to cabarets to sing, but her father encouraged her to attend school in the hope she would become a teacher. After high school, she attended the Normal School for Teachers in Havana with the intent of becoming a literature teacher. At the time being a singer was not viewed as an entirely respectable career. However, one of her teachers told her that, as an entertainer, she could earn in one day what most Cuban teachers earned in a month. From 1947, Cruz studied music theory, voice, and piano at Havana's National Conservatory of Music.

One day, her cousin took her to Havana's radio station Radio García-Serra, where she became a contestant in the "Hora del té" amateur radio program. It was her first time using a microphone and she sang the tango "Nostalgia" (as a tribute to Paulina Álvarez), winning a cake as the first prize for her performance. On other occasions she won silver chains, as well as opportunities to participate in more contests. She also sang in other amateur radio programs such as La suprema corte del arte, broadcast by CMQ, always winning first prize. The only exception was when she competed against Vilma Valle, having to split their earnings: 25 dollars each.

In 2004, the Miami Herald revealed from partially declassified US State Department papers that Cruz had been linked to Cuba's pre-Revolution communist party, the Popular Socialist Party (PSP), as early as the 1940s. The article, promoted as an "exclusive", was written by Miami Herald journalist Carol Rosenberg from Freedom of Information Act requests. It made several revelations. Among them, the US Embassy in Havana denied Cruz a US visa in 1952 and 1955 because of suspected communist affiliations. The article also states that Cruz had joined the youth wing of the PSP at age 20 and had used a concert to arrange a secret meeting with communists in South America on behalf of its then general secretary, Blas Roca Calderío, who has also founded the party in 1925. Cruz had also signed a public letter in support of one of the Party's front groups, the Pro-Peace Congress. The article states that Cruz's surviving husband, Pedro Knight, was asked about this, and is quoted he knew nothing about it. "She never told me about that. She never talked about politics," the article quotes Knight.

Career

First recordings 
Isolina Carrillo was one of the first people to recognize Cruz's ability to sing Afro-Cuban music and asked her to join her Conjunto Siboney, where Olga Guillot also sang. She later joined Orquesta de Ernesto Duarte, Gloria Matancera, Sonora Caracas and Orquesta Anacaona. From 1947, she started to sing in Havana's most popular cabarets: Tropicana, Sans Souci, Bamboo, Topeka, etc. In 1948, Roderico Rodney Neyra founded the group of dancers and singers Las Mulatas de Fuego (The Fiery Mulattas). Cruz was hired with this group as a singer, reaching great success and making presentations in Mexico and Venezuela, where she made her first recordings. Shortly thereafter, Cruz began to sing on musical programs at Radio Cadena Suaritos, along with a group that performed Santería music under the direction of Obdulio Morales. With this group, known as Coro Yoruba y Tambores Batá, she made several recordings that were later released by Panart.

Sonora Matancera 
Cruz's big break came in 1950 when Myrta Silva, the singer with Cuba's Sonora Matancera, returned to her native Puerto Rico. Since they were in need of a new singer, the band decided to give the young Celia Cruz a chance. She auditioned in June, and at the end of July she was asked to join as lead singer, and thus became the group's first black frontwoman. In her first rehearsal with Sonora Matancera, Cruz met her future husband Pedro Knight, who was the band's second trumpeter. Cruz debuted with the group on 3 August 1950. Initially, Cruz was not received with enthusiasm by the public, but Rogelio Martínez had faith in her. On 15 December 1950, Cruz recorded her first songs with the group, which were a resounding success. Her "musical marriage" with the Sonora Matancera lasted fifteen years. In total Celia recorded 188 songs with the Matancera, including hits such as "Cao cao maní picao", "Mata siguaraya", "Burundanga" and "El yerbero moderno". She won her first gold record for "Burundanga", making her first trip to the United States in 1957 to receive the award and to perform at St. Nicholas Arena, New York. During her 15 years with Sonora Matancera, she appeared in cameos in some Mexican films such as Rincón criollo (1950), Una gallega en La Habana (1955) and Amorcito corazón (1961), toured all over Latin America and became a regular at the Tropicana.

Exile and Tico recordings 
On 15 July 1960, following the Cuban Revolution, a contract for Sonora Matancera in Mexico arose. Cruz never imagined that she would never set foot on Cuban soil again. The new Cuban regime disapproved of the group accepting offers to work abroad, specifically in the United States. Thus, the Castro regime arbitrarily forbade her to return to Cuba. When she completed a month of stay in Mexico, she received the news of the death of her father Simón Cruz. In 1961, Cruz and Sonora Matancera left Mexico for an engagement in the United States. During this period, Cruz began performing solo without the group, performing at a recital at the Hollywood Palladium in Los Angeles. In 1962, before the refusal of the Cuban government to allow her to return to Cuba, Cruz acquired a house in New York. Although she tried to return to Cuba to see her sick mother, who was struggling with terminal bladder cancer, the Cuban government denied her request to return. On 7 April 1962, she received the news of the death of her mother Catalina Alfonso. That same year, on 14 July, Cruz was married in civil ceremony with Pedro Knight after a romance of several years. Cruz and Sonora Matancera made their first tour outside of the Americas, visiting Europe and Japan, where they performed with Tito Puente. In 1965, Cruz would culminate a vertiginous fifteen years with the Sonora Matancera. Cruz began a solo career and her husband Pedro Knight decided to leave his position at Sonora Matancera to become her representative, arranger and personal director. During this time, Cruz became an American citizen.

In 1966, Cruz was contacted by Tito Puente to perform with his orchestra. Their first collaborative album, Son con guaguancó featured a recording of José Claro Fumero's guaracha "Bemba colorá", which became one of Cruz's signature songs.  Cruz and Puente went on to collaborate on another four albums together. She also recorded albums with other musical directors such as Memo Salamanca, Juan Bruno Tarraza and Lino Frías for Tico Records. In 1974, Fania Records, the leading salsa record label, acquired Tico and signed Cruz to the imprint Vaya Records, where she remained until 1992.

The Fania years 

Cruz's association with the Fania label had begun in 1973, when she recorded the lead vocals of "Gracia divina", a song by Larry Harlow which was part of his "Latin opera" Hommy. She then joined the Fania All-Stars, a salsa supergroup featuring the most popular performers of the Fania roster. With them, Cruz first sang "Bemba colorá" and "Diosa del ritmo" in San Juan, Puerto Rico in 1973. She later travelled with the group to Kinshasa, Zaire, in 1974 and returned to San Juan in 1975 for another concert. These live recordings were commercially released years later. Her performance in Zaire, as part of The Rumble in the Jungle event, was included in the film Soul Power.

Cruz recorded her first studio album for Fania in 1974 in collaboration with Johnny Pacheco, the label's founder and musical director. The album, Celia & Johnny, and its lead single, "Quimbara", were both a commercial success. In 1976, she participated in the documentary film Salsa about Latin culture, along with figures like Dolores del Río and Willie Colón. The following year she recorded her first LP with Colón, a collaboration that would be repeated with great success in 1981 and 1987. When touring with Colón, Cruz wore a flamboyant costume, which included various colored wigs, tight sequined dresses, and very high heels. Her fashion style became so famous that one of them was acquired by the Smithsonian institution. In the late 1970s, she participated in an Eastern Air Lines commercial in Puerto Rico, singing the catchy phrase ¡Esto sí es volar! (This is to truly fly!). Cruz also used to sing the identifying spot for WQBA radio station in Miami, formerly known as "La Cubanísima": "I am the voice of Cuba, from this land, far away...I am liberty, I am WQBA, the most Cuban!" (Yo soy de Cuba, la voz, desde esta tierra lejana... ¡soy libertad, soy WQBA, Cubanísima!).

In 1982, Celia was reunited with the Sonora Matancera and recorded the album Feliz Encuentro. That year, the singer received the first tribute of her career at Madison Square Garden in New York. In 1987, Cruz performed a concert in Santa Cruz de Tenerife. That concert was recognized by the publisher of the Guinness Book of Records as the largest free-entry outdoor concert, with an audience of 250,000 people. In 1988, she participated in the feature film Salsa alongside Robby Draco Rosa. In 1990, Cruz won her first Grammy Award (Best Tropical Latin Performance) for her album Ritmo en el corazón, recorded with Ray Barretto. She was also invited to celebrate the 65th anniversary of the Sonora Matancera in Central Park in New York. The decline of Fania's brand of salsa dura in favor of the emergent salsa romántica gradually brought an end to Celia's musical association with the Fania All Stars. Their final reunions took place in Puerto Rico (1994) and Colombia (1995), both of which were released on CD.

Later years

In 1990, Cruz managed to return to Cuba. She was invited to make a presentation at the Guantanamo Bay Naval Base. When she came out of this presentation she took in a bag a few grams of earth from Cuba, the same one she asked to be placed in her coffin when she died. In 1994, she received the National Endowment for the Arts award from the then President Bill Clinton, which is the highest recognition granted by the United States government to an artist.
Having made musical presentations in Mexican and Cuban films, in 1992 Celia participated as an actress in the American film Mambo Kings, along with Armand Assante and Antonio Banderas. A year later she made her debut as a television actress in the Mexican telenovela Valentina, along with Verónica Castro for the Televisa network. In 1995, Celia made a guest appearance in the American film The Perez Family, along with Alfred Molina and Anjelica Huston. In 1997, she starred again for Televisa in the Mexican telenovela El alma no tiene color, a remake of the classic Mexican film Angelitos negros. Cruz played the role of a black woman who gives birth to a white daughter. On 25 October 1997, the city of San Francisco, California, officially declared that date as "Celia Cruz Day".

In 1998, she released the album Mi vida es cantar, which featured one of her most successful songs, "La vida es un carnaval". In 1999, she performed with Luciano Pavarotti for the Pavarotti and Friends concert. In 2000, Cruz released a new album under the auspices of Sony Music, Celia Cruz and Friends: A Night of Salsa, where she recorded again with Tito Puente, who died a shortly after. Thanks to this album, Cruz was awarded her first Latin Grammy. In 2001, the album Siempre viviré makes her the creditor of her second Latin Grammy. In that same year, she performed with Marc Anthony in a tribute to Aretha Franklin for VH1. In 2002, Cruz released the album, La negra tiene tumbao, where she ventured into modern variants of Caribbean rhythms, influenced by rap and hip hop. For this record she won her third Latin Grammy and her second American Grammy.

On 16 July 2002, Cruz performed to a full house at the free outdoor performing arts festival Central Park SummerStage in New York City. During the performance she sang "Bemba colorá".  A live recording of this song was subsequently made available in 2005 on a commemorative CD honoring the festival's then 20-year history entitled, "Central Park SummerStage: Live from the Heart of the City". Cruz appeared on the Dionne Warwick albums Dionne Sings Dionne and My Friends & Me with their Latin duet version of "(Do You Know The Way To) San José".

Death 

In August and September 2002, Cruz underwent surgery due to breast cancer. In November that year, Cruz fell during a concert in Mexico. She was diagnosed with glioma, an aggressive form of brain cancer, and underwent surgery in December. Confident, Cruz said she did not shed one tear and that she was aiming to resume her artistic career. She finished recording her last album, Regalo del Alma. In February, she appeared in public again at the 45th Annual Grammy Awards to receive the award for Best Salsa Album. In March 2003, she was paid tribute by the US Hispanic network Telemundo. The event, titled ¡Celia Cruz: Azúcar!, involved figures such as Gloria Estefan, Marc Anthony, La India, Gloria Gaynor and Patti LaBelle among others. This was her last public appearance.

On the afternoon of 16 July 2003, Cruz died at her home in Fort Lee, New Jersey, at the age of 77. At her express wish, her mortal remains were first transferred to Miami for two days to receive the homage of her Cuban exile admirers, returning and finally resting in the Woodlawn Cemetery in The Bronx, New York. An epilogue in her autobiography notes that, in accordance with her wishes, Cuban soil which she had saved from a visit to Guantánamo Bay was used in her entombment.

Tributes and legacy 

Cruz's legacy has been honored since years before her death, including a star on the Hollywood Walk of Fame (1987), the asteroid name 5212 Celiacruz (1989), the Excellence Awards at the 1990 Lo Nuestro Awards, and Celia Cruz Way in Miami (1991). She was also recognized with a star on Boulevard Amador Bendayán in Caracas, Venezuela, and a figure in the Hollywood Wax Museum. Besides, Cruz received three Honoris Causa doctorates from three universities in the United States: Yale University, Florida International University and the University of Miami. Cruz, along with fellow Afro-Cuban musician Cachao, were inducted into the Billboard Latin Music Hall of Fame in 1994. She was also inducted into the International Latin Music Hall of Fame in 1999. In the same year, she was presented with the ASCAP Latin Heritage Award becoming the first recipient of the accolade.

Through a formidable work ethic, Cruz rose to the very top in her genre. In February 2004, her last album, Regalo del Alma, she won a posthumous award at the Premios Lo Nuestro for best salsa release of the year. It was announced in December 2005 that a musical called ¡Azúcar! would open in Tenerife before touring the world. The name comes from Cruz's well-known catch phrase of "¡Azúcar!" (“Sugar!”).

In 2003, a music school was opened in the Bronx, named the Celia Cruz Bronx High School of Music. Pedro Knight visited this school before his death to meet the students and share stories about her life.
On June 4, 2004, the heavily Cuban-American community of Union City, New Jersey heralded its annual Cuban Day Parade by dedicating its new Celia Cruz Park (also known as Celia Cruz Plaza), which features a sidewalk star in her honor, at 31st Street and Bergenline Avenue, with Cruz's widower, Pedro Knight, present. There are four other similar dedications to Cruz around the world. Cruz's star has expanded into Union City's "Walk of Fame", as new marble stars are added each spring to honor Latin entertainment and media personalities, such as merengue singer Joseíto Mateo, salsa singer La India, Cachao, Cuban tenor Beny Moré, Tito Puente, Spanish language television news anchor Rafael Pineda, salsa pioneer Johnny Pacheco, singer/bandleader Gilberto Santa Rosa and music promoter Ralph Mercado.

On 18 May 2005, the National Museum of American History, administered by the Smithsonian Institution and located in Washington, D.C., opened "¡Azúcar!", an exhibit celebrating the life and music of Celia Cruz. The exhibit highlights important moments in Cruz's life and career through photographs, personal documents, costumes, videos, and music. Her biography Celia: Mi vida was also published in 2005, based on more than 500 hours of interviews with the Mexican journalist Ana Cristina Reymundo. The journalist and TV presenter Cristina Saralegui planned to take the story of her life to the cinema and the American actress Whoopi Goldberg, admirer of the singer, expressed her interest in representing her, but the project was cancelled. From 26 September 2007 to 25 May 2008, Celia, a musical based on the life of Celia Cruz, played at the Off-Broadway venue New World Stages. The show won four 2008 HOLA Awards from the Hispanic Organization of Latin Actors.

On 16 March 2011, Celia Cruz was honored by the United States Postal Service with a commemorative postage stamp. The Cruz stamp was one of a group of five stamps honoring Latin music greats, also including Selena, Tito Puente, Carmen Miranda, and Carlos Gardel. The Smithsonian's National Museum of American History collaborated with photographer Robert Weingarten to create an object-based portrait of Celia Cruz featuring artifacts in the museum. The portrait was unveiled on 3 October 2012.

On 21 October 2013, Google honored her with a Google Doodle. Jennifer Lopez honored Cruz with her presentation at the 41st American Music Awards ceremony. The singers Yuri, La India, Maluma and Aymée Nuviola did the same at the Latin American Music Awards. Also in 2013, Cruz was inducted into the New Jersey Hall Fame. In October 2015, Telemundo premiered an 80-episode docu-drama based on Cruz's life, Celia.

In 2015, the television networks RCN Televisión and Telemundo, made the Celia a TV series, based on the life of Celia Cruz. Celia was played by the actresses Jeimy Osorio and Aymée Nuviola and counted on the voice of Patty Padilla. In 2019, Angélique Kidjo released a tribute album to Cruz, entitled Celia, including songs spanning all of Celia's Cruz career reinvented with an Afrobeat feel. It features Tony Allen (musician), Meshell Ndegeocello and the Gangbé Brass Band.

In 2018, a monument to Celia Cruz was unveiled in the Cuban Heritage Park in Hialeah, Florida. Also in 2018, the Celia Cruz Estate launched a brand inspired by Cruz which featured merchandise inspired and about Cruz.

In 2019, Chilean-American poet Marjorie Agosin created a chamber music theatre performance titled "Las Magníficas" (The Magnificent Ones), based on the life of Celia Cruz and Chilean singer-songwriter Violeta Parra.

On June 2, 2021, the City of New York honored Celia Cruz by co-naming the intersection of Reservoir Avenue and East 195th Street in the Kingsbridge Heights section of The Bronx, near the High School that is the named in her honor, "Celia Cruz Way".

In February 2023, Cruz was selected as an honoree in the 2024 American Women quarter program, making her the first Afro-Latina to appear on a U.S quarter.

Discography 

 Cuba's Foremost Rhythm Singer (1958)
 Incomparable Celia (1958)
 Mi Diario Musical (1959)
 Canciones Premiadas (1961)
 Homenaje a Los Santos (1964)
 Canciones que Yo Quería Haber Grabado Primero (1965)
 Sabor y Ritmo de Pueblos (1965)
 Cuba Y Puerto Rico Son (1966)
 Son con Guaguancó (1966)
 Bravo Celia Cruz (1967)
 A Ti México (1967)
 Excitante (1968)
 Serenata Guajira (1968)
 Quimbo Quimbumbia (1969)
 Etc. Etc. Etc. (1970)
 Celia y Tito Puente en España (1971)
   Celia Cruz/Tito Puente Algo Especial Para Recordar (1972)
 Celia & Johnny (1974)
 Tremendo Caché (1975)
 Recordando El Ayer (1976)
 Only They Could Have Made This Album (1977)
 Homenaje A Beny More (1978)
   Celia Cruz Y La Sonora Ponceña La Ceiba (1979)
 Celia/Johnny/Pete (1980)
 Celia & Willie (1981)
 Feliz Encuentro (1982)
 Tremendo Trío (1983)
 Candela (1986)
 De Nuevo (1986)
 Winners (1987)
 Ritmo en el Corazón (1988)
 Guarachera del Mundo (1990)
 Canta Celia Cruz (1991)
 Reina del Ritmo Cubano (1991)
 Tributo a Ismael Rivera (1992)
 Verdadera Historia (1992)
 Azucar Negra (1993)
 Boleros Polydor (1993)
 Homenaje a Beny Moré, Vol. 3 (1993)
 Introducing (1993)
 Guaracheras de La Guaracha (1994)
 Homenaje a Los Santos (1994)
 Irrepetible (1994)
 Mambo del Amor (1994)
 Merengue Saludos Amigos (1994)
 Cuba's Queen of Rhythm (1995)
 Double Dynamite (1995)
 Festejando Navidad (1995)
 Irresistible (1995)
 Celia Cruz Delta (1996)
 Cambiando Ritmos (1997)
 Duets (1997)
 También Boleros (1997)
 Afro-Cubana (1998)
 Mi Vida Es Cantar (1998)
 En Vivo C.M.Q., Vol. 4 (1999)
 En Vivo C.M.Q., Vol. 5 (1999)
 En Vivo Radio Progreso, Vol. 1 (1999)
 En Vivo Radio Progreso, Vol. 2 (1999)
 En Vivo Radio Progreso, Vol. 3 (1999)
 Celia Cruz and Friends: A Night of Salsa (1999)
 Habanera (2000)
 Salsa (2000)
 Siempre Viviré (2000)
 La Negra Tiene Tumbao (2001)
 Hits Mix (2002)
 Unrepeatable (2002)
 Homenaje a Beny Moré (2003)
 Regalo del Alma (2003)
 Dios disfrute a la Reina (2004)
 Havana Nights (2019)

Filmography 
 Salón México (Mexico, 1950)
 Una gallega en La Habana (Mexico, 1952)
 ¡Olé... Cuba! (Mexico/Cuba, 1957)
 Affair in Havana (USA/Cuba, 1957)
 Amorcito Corazón (Mexico, 1960)
 Salsa (Documentary, 1976)
 Salsa (USA, 1988)
 "Fires Within" (USA, 1991)
 The Mambo Kings (USA, 1992)
 Valentina (TV) (Mexico, 1993)
 The Perez Family (USA, 1995) Luz Pat
 El alma no tiene color (TV) (Mexico, 1997)
 ¡Celia Cruz: Azúcar! (TV) (Tribute, USA, 2003)
 Soul Power (Documentary of Kinshasa, Zaire Music Festival 1974) (USA, 2008)
 CELIA, Celia Cruz Bio-Drama (2015 on Telemundo)

Awards

Grammy Awards
The Grammy Awards are awarded annually by the National Academy of Recording Arts and Sciences in the United States. Celia Cruz has received two awards from fourteen nominations, as well as a non-competitive Lifetime Achievement award.

|-
| align="center"|1979
| Eternos
| Best Latin Recording
|
|-
| align="center"|1983
| Tremendo Trío
|rowspan="5"| Best Tropical Latin Recording
|
|-
| align="center"|1985
| De Nuevo
|
|-
| align="center"|1986
| Homenaje A Beny More - Vol. III
|
|-
| align="center"|1987
| The Winners
|
|-
| align="center"|1989
| "Ritmo En El Corazón"
|
|-
| align="center"|1992
| Tributo a Ismael Rivera
|rowspan="2"| Best Tropical Latin Album
|
|-
| align="center"|1993
| Azúcar Negra
|
|-
| align="center"|1995
| Irrepetible
| Best Tropical Latin Performance
|
|-
| 1997
| "Guantanamera"
| Best Rap Performance for a Duo or Group
|
|-
| 1998
| Mi Vida Es Cantar
| Best Tropical Latin Performance
|
|-
| align="center"|2000
| Celia Cruz and Friends: A Night of Salsa
|rowspan="2"| Best Salsa Album
|
|-
| align="center"|2002
| La Negra Tiene Tumbao
| 
|-
| align="center"|2003
| Regalo del Alma
| Best Salsa/Merengue Album
| 
|}

Grammy Lifetime Achievement Award
The Grammy Lifetime Achievement Award is presented to those who, during their lifetimes, have made creative contributions of outstanding artistic significance to the field of recording. Celia Cruz won the award in 2016.

|-
| align="center"|2016
| Herself
| Grammy Lifetime Achievement Award
| 
|}

Latin Grammy Awards
A Latin Grammy Award is an accolade by the Latin Academy of Recording Arts & Sciences to recognize outstanding achievement in the music industry. Celia Cruz has won four awards out of seven nominations.

|-
| align="center"|2000
| Celia Cruz and Friends: A Night of Salsa
| Best Salsa Album
|
|-
| align="center"|2001
| Siempre Viveré
| Best Traditional Tropical Album
|
|-
| align="center" rowspan="4"|2002
|rowspan="2"| "La Negra Tiene Tumbao"
| Record of the Year
|
|-
| Best Music Video
|
|-
|rowspan="2"| La Negra Tiene Tumbao
| Album of the Year
|
|-
| Best Salsa Album
|
|-
| align="center" |2004
| Regalo del Alma
| Best Salsa Album
| 
|}
Cruz is also the recipient of the president's National Medal of Arts.

See also 
 Honorific nicknames in popular music
 Music of Cuba
 History of Cuba
 Pedro Knight - Cruz's musician husband
 List of Cubans

References

External links 

 
 
 Celia Cruz video archive
 Celia Cruz at Afrocuba.org
 Celia Cruz collection, 1948–2008 at the Cuban Heritage Collection, University of Miami Libraries (photographs, newspaper clippings, music scores, and a range of other materials documenting Cruz's professional activities)
 Celia Cruz discography (album covers) at Florida International University archives
 Celia Cruz discography (recordings) at Florida International University archives
 ¡Azúcar! The Life and Music of Celia Cruz at the National Museum of American History

Cuban women singers
Guaracha singers
Bolero singers
Mambo musicians
Salsa musicians
Latin Grammy Award winners
Spanish-language singers of the United States
United States National Medal of Arts recipients
1925 births
2003 deaths
People from Havana
Afro-Cuban culture
American entertainers of Cuban descent
Cuban feminists
Women in Latin music
Cuban Roman Catholics
Cuban Santeríans
Deaths from brain cancer in the United States
Cuban emigrants to the United States
Burials at Woodlawn Cemetery (Bronx, New York)
People from Fort Lee, New Jersey
Fania Records artists
Feminist musicians
RMM Records artists
Sony Discos artists
Grammy Lifetime Achievement Award winners
People with acquired American citizenship
Yoruba-language singers
20th-century American women singers
20th-century American singers
21st-century American women